Ramaraju is a play written by Srinivasa Rao. Its subject is the fall of the Vijayanagara.

See also
Vijayanagara Empire
Vijayanagara
Aliya Rama Raya
Deccan Sultanates

References

Indian plays